Fadathul Najwa Nurfarahain Azmi  (born 6 November 1995) is a Malaysian women's international footballer who plays as a midfielder. She is a member of the Malaysia women's national football team. She was part of the team at the 2016 AFF Women's Championship. On club level she played for Perak FA in Malaysia.

References

1995 births
Living people
Malaysian women's footballers
Malaysia women's international footballers
Place of birth missing (living people)
Women's association football midfielders